The 1989 Karnataka Legislative Assembly election was held in the Indian state of Karnataka to elect 224 members of the Karnataka Legislative Assembly. The Indian National Congress rode back to power with a huge majority.

Results

|- align=center
|colspan=10|
|-
!colspan=2 style="background-color:#E9E9E9" align=center|Political Party
!style="background-color:#E9E9E9" |Seats contested
!style="background-color:#E9E9E9" |Seats won
!style="background-color:#E9E9E9" |Number of Votes
!style="background-color:#E9E9E9" |% of Votes
!style="background-color:#E9E9E9" |Seat change
|-
| 
|align="left"|Indian National Congress||221||178||7,990,142||43.76%|| 113
|-
| 
|align="left"|Janata Dal||209||24||4,943,854||27.08%|| 24
|-
| 
|align="left"|Bharatiya Janata Party||118||4||755,032||4.14%|| 2
|-
| 
|align="left"|Janata Party (JP)||217||2||2,070,341||11.34%|| 137
|-
|
|align="left"|Karnataka Rajya Raitha Sangha||105||2||654,801||3.59%|| 2
|-
| 
|align="left"|All India Anna Dravida Munnetra Kazhagam||1||1||32,928||0.18%|| 1
|-
| 
|align="left"|Muslim League||13||1||80,612||0.44%|| 1
|-
| 
|align="left"|Independents||1088||12||1,482,482||8.12%|| 1
|-
|colspan=2 align="left"|Total||2043||224||18,257,909||
|-
|}

Elected members

References

Karnataka
State Assembly elections in Karnataka
1980s in Karnataka